Company of Heroes 3 is a real-time strategy game developed by Relic Entertainment and published by Sega for Windows. A sequel to Company of Heroes 2, the game features new mechanics and modes and is set in the Italian and North African theaters of World War II.

Gameplay 
In Company of Heroes 3, the players take the role of Allied Forces during their invasion of Italy and Axis forces in the North African campaign.

The game has features new to the series such as the Tactical Pause system, which allows the player to pause a battle and queue up commands to be done after the game is resumed. Company of Heroes 3 also has an improved destruction system that gives the title more granular destruction, such as individual tiles and bricks crumbling off buildings. Italian Partisans are allied NPCs that can either be used on the map or be called in during battles. The story is dynamic, and the player's interactions with the game's various commanders can affect the narrative's ending.

Development 
Relic Entertainment led the game's development. The team chose the Mediterranean theatre as the setting allowed the inclusion of a variety of environments, which is a feature frequently requested by players of older games. In addition, the team added that the Italian areas in the game offered "broader palette for environmental gameplay" and players can make use of verticality of the maps to plan their moves and attacks.

At the beginning of development, the studio recruited modders and competitive players to form a player council. The council worked with Relic during preproduction to determine what the new entry should focus on mechanically and where the game should take place. The executive producer commented on how it was chosen: "And we all agreed that we wanted a new theatre, we didn't want to revisit the Western Front or the Eastern Front. So really, the only two things left were the Mediterranean and Pacific. We put them both on the board, and it was just 10-0. Mediterranean over Pacific." Player testing for Company of Heroes 3 started in prior to the official announcement through Amplitude's Games2Gether program. A demo for the game was available for a limited time shortly after the announcement.

The game was officially announced for Windows by Relic and publisher Sega in July 2021. It was originally set to be released on November 17, 2022, but it was delayed to February 23, 2023. Console versions of the game were announced during The Game Awards 2022, and the game is set to be released for PlayStation 5 and Xbox Series X/S in 2023.

In August 2022, the Polish toy company Cobi announced that they acquired a license with Relic Entertainment to publish North Africa and Italy themed brick sets.

Reception 

Company of Heroes 3 received "generally favorable" reviews, according to review aggregator Metacritic.

PC Gamer noted that the Italian campaign was a mess, with AI lacking aggressiveness and the confused implementation of subcommanders. PCGamesN felt that although the gameplay lacked innovation, it lived up to previous entries, "The central story missions don’t do a lot to innovate on what Company of Heroes 2 established almost a decade ago, but they’re a hell of a lot of fun". While feeling mixed on the North African campaign's portrayal of Erwin Rommel, Eurogamer enjoyed the game's bombastic spectacle, writing, "Everything can be blown to bits, which dovetails rather nicely with a campaign about shooting things with tanks". 

IGN liked the set piece encounters of the Italian campaign, but criticized the overall experience, "Every decision on the campaign map is just so low-stakes that it just feels like a waste of time". Polygon praised the new active pause system, saying "it makes for a vastly more approachable game".

References

External links 
 

2023 video games
Real-time strategy video games
PlayStation 5 games
Relic Entertainment games
Sega video games
Video game sequels
Video games set in Africa
Video games set in Italy
World War II video games
Multiplayer and single-player video games
Video games developed in Canada
Xbox Series X and Series S games
Windows games
Company of Heroes